Lihué Darío Prichoda (born 28 June 1989) is an Argentine professional footballer who plays as a midfielder for Venezuelan Primera División side Academia Puerto Cabello.
2018 player of deportivo madryn. Torneo federal A 2018/19

Club career

Racing Club
Prichoda began his playing career in 2008 with Racing Club, he made his debut on 10 August 2008 in a 0-2 home defeat to Lanús. After making 18 appearances for Racing he joined 2nd division side San Martín de Tucumán in 2009 as a lending operation. His sporting rights are property of Racing Club. Now he is a member of the professional team of Tiro Federal, a popular club from Ludueña neighborhood in Rosario City.

References

External links
 Argentine Primera statistics
 Lihué Prichoda at Soccerway

1989 births
Living people
Sportspeople from Buenos Aires Province
Argentine footballers
Argentine expatriate footballers
Association football midfielders
Racing Club de Avellaneda footballers
San Martín de Tucumán footballers
Club Atlético Banfield footballers
Club Atlético Colón footballers
Tiro Federal footballers
Unión San Felipe footballers
Nueva Chicago footballers
Gimnasia y Esgrima de Jujuy footballers
Deportivo Madryn players
Argentino de Quilmes players
Academia Puerto Cabello players
Chilean Primera División players
Argentine Primera División players
Primera Nacional players
Primera B Metropolitana players
Torneo Federal A players
Venezuelan Primera División players
Argentine expatriate sportspeople in Chile
Argentine expatriate sportspeople in Venezuela
Expatriate footballers in Chile
Expatriate footballers in Venezuela